Joseph Westwood (11 February 1884 – 17 July 1948) was a Scottish Labour Party politician.

Educated at Buckhaven Higher Grade School, he worked as a draper's apprentice, messenger boy and miner. Westwood was an Industrial Organiser for Fife miners from 1916–18 and a political organiser for Scottish Miners from 1918 to 1929.

Biography
Westwood was elected as the Member of Parliament for Peebles and Southern Midlothian at the 1922 general election, and represented the constituency until he lost the seat in 1931. He was a candidate for East Fife at a by-election in February 1933 and was elected at Stirling and Falkirk in 1935, for which he represented until his death thirteen years later.

Westwood was Parliamentary Private Secretary to William Adamson as Secretary of State for Scotland from June 1929, and served as Parliamentary Under-Secretary of State for Scotland from March to August 1931 and again from May 1940 until May 1945. He served as Secretary of State for Scotland from July 1945 until October 1947.
He was appointed a Privy Counsellor in 1943.

His tenure as Secretary of State for Scotland has been considered as lacklustre. In the view of George Pottinger (a former civil servant who wrote a history of the Secretaries of State for Scotland from 1926 to 1976), Westwood was a chronically indecisive politician and concludes that "it is best to regard Westwood's time as an intermission." In addition to his personal indecision, Westwood was disadvantaged by the fact that the Attlee ministry of which he was a Cabinet member was highly centralised in pursuing its objectives, and appeals that were specifically Scottish (or Welsh, or of a particular English region) were distrusted and generally disregarded by the Government. Consequently, Westwood struggled to secure Cabinet backing for specifically Scottish measures in a way that his recent predecessors, most notably Tom Johnston, did not.

Westwood died in a car accident in 1948, and is buried in Dysart Cemetery, by Kirkcaldy in Fife, together with his wife.

References 

Pottinger, George, The Secretaries of State for Scotland, 1926-1976 (Scottish Academic Press, 1979), 
Torrance, David, The Scottish Secretaries (Birlinn 2006)

External links 

1884 births
1948 deaths
British Secretaries of State
Members of the Parliament of the United Kingdom for Stirling constituencies
Members of the Privy Council of the United Kingdom
Ministers in the Churchill wartime government, 1940–1945
People from Buckhaven
Road incident deaths in the United Kingdom
Scottish Labour MPs
Scottish miners
Scottish trade unionists
Secretaries of State for Scotland
UK MPs 1922–1923
UK MPs 1923–1924
UK MPs 1924–1929
UK MPs 1929–1931
UK MPs 1935–1945
UK MPs 1945–1950
Ministers in the Attlee governments, 1945–1951